The following is a list of songs produced, co-produced and remixed by 88-Keys.

External links
 [ AllHipHop Credits]
 Discogs

Production discographies
Hip hop discographies
Discographies of American artists